Richard Steiff (February 7, 1877 – March 30, 1939) was a German designer, known for helping create the teddy bear. In 1897 he joined Steiff, a stuffed toy company founded in his hometown Giengen by his aunt Margarete Steiff, and gave the company an enormous boost by creating stuffed animals from drawings made at the zoo.

Early life
Steiff was born in Giengen, and entered his aunt Margarete's toymaking enterprise in 1897. While attending the School of Arts and Crafts (Kunstgewerbeschule) in Stuttgart, he would regularly visit the nearby Nill'scher Zoo (closed 1906) and spend much of his time drawing the residents of the bear enclosure. His sketches of the bears were incorporated into the prototype of the toy bear he created in 1902 and codenamed Steiff Bär 55 PB (where 55 = the bear's height in centimeters; P = Plüsch, plush; and B = beweglich, moveable limbs).

Career with the Steiff company

At its debut at the Leipzig Toy Fair in 1903, the bear initially attracted little attention, but its fortunes were saved when an American buyer snapped up the entire lot of 100 bears and ordered another 3,000 just before the exhibition finished. Thus began the heyday of the Steiff company, which had been founded by Margarete Steiff in 1880. At the St. Louis World's Fair in 1904, the Steiffs sold 12,000 bears and received the Gold Medal, which was the highest honor at the event. The kind of toy bear they pioneered acquired the appellation "teddy" from several legends about Theodore Roosevelt. Steiff bears, with a small metal "Steiff" clip in the ear, can now be quite valuable.

Richard Steiff also attained several technological milestones. He developed the Roloplan, a kind of kite which could take aerial photographs of the Steiff factory and its surroundings in Giengen. The Imperial German Army expressed interest in the Roloplan for aerial reconnaissance, but abandoned such plans when it proved to be unreliably slow.

In 1903, Steiff planned and erected in Giengen a factory building of concrete and steel called the Jungfrauenaquarium (Virgins' Aquarium), which allowed the workers inside to enjoy ample natural light, a first for its time. He equipped the building with a ramp so that his aunt could reach the upper levels of the factory in her wheelchair.

In 1923, Richard left his wife Else in Giengen Benz, Germany and boarded the SS President Arthur bound for New York City and arrived on March 20, 1923. On October 1, 1923, he signed a Declaration of Intention to become a United States citizen in the Atlantic County, NJ Court of Common Pleas. At this time he was residing at 2445 Boardwalk, Atlantic City, NJ.

Steiff died in 1939 at the age of 62 in Jackson, Michigan, United States.

See also
Stuffed toy
Morris Michtom
Robert (doll)

Notes

References
Pfeiffer, Günther. 125 Jahre Steiff Firmengeschichte - Die Margarethe Steiff GmbH. Königswinter: Heel Verlag GmbH, 2005. .

External links

1877 births
1939 deaths
20th-century German inventors
Toy inventors
Businesspeople from Baden-Württemberg
People from Heidenheim (district)
German emigrants to the United States